The Women's time trial of the 2015 UCI Road World Championships took place in and around in Richmond, Virginia, United States on September 22, 2015. Lisa Brennauer was the defending champion, after winning her first world time trial title in 2014.

New Zealand's Linda Villumsen won her first world title, after five previous medal finishes, by 2.54 seconds ahead of Anna van der Breggen of the Netherlands, while defending champion Brennauer finished in the bronze medal position, 5.26 seconds behind Villumsen. Australia's Katrin Garfoot finished just off the podium in fourth, 9.32 seconds off the winning time. Ellen van Dijk, one of the favorites, finished disappointingly seventh. A reason for her performance was that her rear wheel was not well attached in the frame. Her wheel ran into the frame, damaging her tire and puncturing her inner tube.

Qualification

Qualification for the event

All National Federations were allowed to enter four riders for the race, with a maximum of two riders to start. In addition to this number, the outgoing World Champion and the current continental champions were also able to take part.

Olympic qualification
This time trial was also part of the qualification of the women's time trial at the 2016 Summer Olympics. The first ten nations in the time trial qualified one athlete.

Course
The elite women rode two laps of the circuit.

The circuit was a technical course that went through the city of Richmond. From the start, the route headed west from downtown to Monument Avenue, a paver-lined, historic boulevard that's been named one of the "10 Great Streets in America." From there, the course made a 180-degree turn at N. Davis Avenue and continued in the opposite direction. The race then cut through the Uptown district before coming back through Virginia Commonwealth University and then crossing the James River. After a technical turnaround, the race came back across the river and worked its way through downtown Richmond, eventually heading up to ascend  on Governor Street. At the top, the riders had to take a sharp left turn onto the false-flat finishing straight,  to the finish.

Schedule
All times are in Eastern Daylight Time (UTC−4).

Participating nations
44 cyclists from 33 nations took part in the women's time trial. The number of cyclists per nation is shown in parentheses.

 
 
 
 
 
 
 
 
 
 
 
 
 
 
 
 
 
 
 
 
 
 
 
 
 
 
 
 
 
 
 
 
   (host)

Final classification

References

Women's time trial
UCI Road World Championships – Women's time trial
2015 in women's road cycling